Jascha Lieberman is a Polish violinist and violist. He studied with Stefan Kamasa, Giora Feidman, and Lepold Kozłowski. Lieberman was a member of the string quartet conducted by Krzysztof Penderecki.

Festivals

He performed in numerous festivals, most important of which are:
 Sagra Malatestiana Rimini, Italy
 Schleswig-Holstein Music Festival, Germany
 Verbier Festival & Academy, Switzerland

Jascha Lieberman Trio

Jascha Lieberman Trio is a klezmer band from Kraków, Poland, formed in 1995.

The musicians play traditional jewish music, classical music, and jazz. They did perform on television, radio and in concerts in Europe and North America.

Discography

 Remembrance of Kazimierz (1999)
 The Bats Gallery (2010)

See also
 Giora Feidman
 Klezmer music

References

External links
 
 Last.fm profile

Klezmer musicians
Polish musicians